Tropical Storm Wipha was a tropical cyclone that caused significant damages in Vietnam and China. Wipha was the eleventh depression, and the ninth tropical storm of the 2019 Pacific typhoon season.

Meteorological history

On July 30, a tropical depression formed in the South China Sea near the Paracel Islands and Hainan. On the next day, it strengthened into a tropical storm, and the JMA named it Wipha. By July 31, the JTWC upgraded Wipha to a tropical storm, with Wipha making landfall on Hainan Island at peak intensity. On August 3, Wipha weakened to a tropical depression after it made landfall in the northern area of Quảng Ninh Province, delivering drenching rains and strong gusts to northern and north-central localities. On August 4, Wipha dissipated at 12:00 UTC.

Preparation and Impact

Vietnam
In Vietnam, at least 27 people were killed. Thanh Hóa Province was the worst hit province within the nation, with 16 people died alone, and the losses were amounted to 1 trillion đồng (US$43.1 million). Damage in Sơn La Province reached 28 billion đồng (US$1.21 million).

China
Damage in Hainan and Guangxi valued at ¥83.6 million (US$12 million).

See also

Tropical cyclones in 2019

References

Tropical cyclones in 2019
Typhoons in Vietnam
Typhoons in Laos
Typhoons in China
Western Pacific tropical storms